SM UB-113 was a German Type UB III submarine or U-boat in the German Imperial Navy during World War I. She was commissioned into the German Imperial Navy on 25 April 1918 as SM UB-113.

UB-113 was lost in autumn 1918 for unknown reasons. According to recent sources, SM UB-113 probably crossed paths with the French gunboat l'Engageante on 29 August in the Gulf of Gascony and was sunk.

Construction

She was built by Blohm & Voss of Hamburg and following just under a year of construction, launched at Hamburg on 23 September 1917. UB-113 was commissioned in the spring the next year under the command of Oblt.z.S. Ulrich Pilzecker. Like all Type UB III submarines, UB-113 carried 10 torpedoes and was armed with a  deck gun. UB-113 had a displacement of  while surfaced and  when submerged. Her engines enabled her to travel at  when surfaced and  when submerged.

Summary of raiding history

References

Notes

Citations

Bibliography 

 

German Type UB III submarines
World War I submarines of Germany
U-boats commissioned in 1918
1917 ships
Ships built in Hamburg
U-boats sunk in 1918
Ships lost with all hands
Maritime incidents in 1918